Ghodratollah Norouzi  is an Iranian politician, the former mayor of Isfahan county, and former mayor of Isfahan city from 2017 to 2021. He has a doctorate of law. He is a party member of Islamic Iran Freedom and Justice Organization.

References

Mayors of Isfahan
Iranian politicians
Living people
Year of birth missing (living people)